Downtown Macon refers to the largest financial district in the city of Macon, Georgia, United States.  It is home to many museums, ranging from the Georgia Sports Hall of Fame to the Tubman African American Museum. Numerous Antebellum homes are located in Downtown Macon, including the Woodruff House, the Hay House, and the Cannonball House. One of the most notable churches in downtown Macon is Mulberry Street United Methodist Church, the oldest Methodist Church in the state of Georgia.
Terminal Station, was built in 1916.

Overview

Buildings 
Some notable buildings in Downtown Macon are:

Terminal Station
Ramada Plaza
BB&T Building
Fickling & Company Building
St. Paul Towers
Saint Joseph's Catholic Church
Dempsey Apartments
Ashley Towers
Gateway Plaza
Georgia Federal Building
Southern Federal Building
Medical Center of Central Georgia
Mercer University Walter F. George School of Law

Tourism 
The biggest tourist attraction in downtown Macon is the annual Cherry Blossom Festival, but there are also many other smaller attractions, such as the many museums (mentioned above), and also small parades for holidays such as Thanksgiving and Christmas.

Gallery

Buildings

References

External links
 NewTown Macon
 Terminal Station - Georgia's Railroad History & Heritage

Geography of Macon, Georgia
Macon